Denis Ségui Kragbé (10 April 1938 – 4 July 1998) was an Ivorian shot putter and discus thrower who competed in the 1964 Summer Olympics and in the 1968 Summer Olympics.

References

1938 births
1998 deaths
Ivorian shot putters
Ivorian discus throwers
Ivorian male athletes
Male shot putters
Male discus throwers
Olympic athletes of Ivory Coast
Athletes (track and field) at the 1964 Summer Olympics
Athletes (track and field) at the 1968 Summer Olympics
African Games gold medalists for Ivory Coast
African Games medalists in athletics (track and field)
Athletes (track and field) at the 1965 All-Africa Games